Magnetic materials with strong spin-orbit interaction, such as: LaFeAsO, PrFe4P12, YbRu2Ge2, UO2, NpO2, Ce1−xLaxB6, URu2Si2 and many other compounds, are found to have magnetic ordering constituted by high rank multipoles, e.g. quadruple, octople, etc. Due to the strong spin-orbit coupling, multipoles are automatically introduced to the systems when the total angular momentum quantum number J is larger than 1/2. If those multipoles are coupled by some exchange mechanisms, those multipoles could tend to have some ordering as conventional spin 1/2 Heisenberg problem. Except the multipolar ordering, many hidden order phenomena are believed closely related to the multipolar interactions

Tensor operator expansion

Basic concepts 

Then any quantum operators can be represented using the basis set  as a matrix with dimension . Therefore, one can define  matrices to completely expand any quantum operator in this Hilbert space. Taking J=1/2 as an example, a quantum operator A can be expanded as 

Obviously, the matrices:  form a basis set in the operator space. Any quantum operator defined in this Hilbert can be expended by  operators. In the following, let's call these matrices as a super basis to distinguish the eigen basis of quantum states. In fact, this is not the only super basis that does the trick. We can also use Pauli matrices and the identity matrix to form a super basis
      
Since the rotation properties of  follow the same rules as the rank 1 tensor of cubic harmonics  and the identity matrix  follows the same rules as the rank 0 tensor , the basis set  can be called cubic super basis.
      
Again,  share the same rotational properties as rank 1 spherical harmonic tensors , so it is called spherical super basis.

Because atomic orbitals  are also described by spherical or cubic harmonic functions, one can imagine or visualize these operators using the wave functions of atomic orbitals although they are essentially matrices not spatial functions.

For transition super basis, we have . For cubic super basis, we have . For spherical super basis, we have . In group theory,  are called scalar or rank 0 tensor,  are called dipole or rank 1 tensors,  are called quadrupole or rank 2 tensors.

The example tells us, for a -multiplet problem, one will need all rank  tensor operators to form a complete super basis. Therefore, for a  system, its density matrix must have quadrupole components. This is the reason why a  problem will automatically introduce high-rank multipoles to the system

Formal definitions 

A general definition of spherical harmonic super basis of a -multiplet problem can be expressed as 

where the parentheses denote a 3-j symbol; K is the rank which ranges ; Q is the
projection index of rank K which ranges from −K to +K.  A cubic harmonic super basis where all the tensor operators are hermitian can be defined as 

Then, any quantum operator  defined in the -multiplet Hilbert space can be expanded as
 
where the expansion coefficients can be obtained by taking the trace inner product, e.g. .
Apparently, one can make linear combination of these operators to form a new super basis that have different symmetries.

Multi-exchange description 

Using the addition theorem of tensor operators, the product of a rank n tensor and a rank m tensor can generate a new tensor with rank n+m ~ |n-m|. Therefore, a high rank tensor can be expressed as the product of low rank tensors. This convention is useful to interpret the high rank multipolar exchange terms as a "multi-exchange" process of dipoles (or pseudospins).  For example, for the spherical harmonic tensor operators of  case, we have

If so, a quadrupole-quadrupole interaction (see next section) can be considered as a two steps dipole-dipole interaction. For example, so the one step quadrupole transition  on site  now becomes a two steps of dipole transition . Hence not only inter-site-exchange but also intra-site-exchange terms appear (so called multi-exchange). If  is even larger, one can expect more complicated intra-site-exchange terms would appear. However, one has to note that it is not a perturbation expansion but just a mathematical technique. The high rank terms are not necessarily smaller than low rank terms. In many systems, high rank terms are more important than low rank terms.

Multipolar exchange interactions 

There are four major mechanisms to induce exchange interactions between two magnetic moments in a system: 1). Direct exchange 2). RKKY 3). Superexchange 4). Spin-Lattice. No matter which one is dominated, a general form of the exchange interaction can be written as

One can immediately find if  is restricted to 1 only, the Hamiltonian reduces to conventional Heisenberg model.

An important feature of the multipolar exchange Hamiltonian is its anisotropy. The value of coupling constant  is usually very sensitive to the relative angle between two multipoles. Unlike conventional spin only exchange Hamiltonian where the coupling constants are isotropic in a homogeneous system, the highly anisotropic atomic orbitals (recall the shape of the  wave functions) coupling to the system's magnetic moments will inevitably introduce huge anisotropy even in a homogeneous system. This is one of the main reasons that most multipolar orderings tend to be non-colinear.

Antiferromagnetism of multipolar moments

Unlike magnetic spin ordering where the antiferromagnetism can be defined by flipping the magnetization axis of two neighbor sites from a ferromagnetic configuration, flipping of the magnetization axis of a multipole is usually meaningless. Taking a  moment as an example, if one flips the z-axis by making a  rotation toward the y-axis, it just changes nothing. In this regard, the antiferromagnetic spin ordering is just a special case of this definition, i.e. flipping the phase of a dipole moment is equivalent to flipping its magnetization axis. As for high rank multipoles, e.g. , it actually becomes a  rotation and for  it is even not any kind of rotation.

Computing coupling constants 
Calculation of multipolar exchange interactions remains a challenging issue in many aspects. Although there were many works based on fitting the model Hamiltonians with experiments, predictions of the coupling constants based on first-principle schemes remain lacking. Currently there are two studies implemented first-principles approach to explore multipolar exchange interactions. An early study was developed in 80's. It is based on a mean field approach that can greatly reduce the complexity of coupling constants induced by RKKY mechanism, so the multipolar exchange Hamiltonian can be described by just a few unknown parameters and can be obtained by fitting with experiment data. Later on, a first-principles approach to estimate the unknown parameters was further developed and got good agreements with a few selected compounds, e.g. cerium momnpnictides. Another first-principle approach was also proposed recently. It maps all the coupling constants induced by all static exchange mechanisms to a series of DFT+U total energy calculations and got agreement with uranium dioxide.

References 

Magnetic ordering
Magnetic exchange interactions